Mireille Marokvia (1908 – 19 October 2008) was a French writer best known for her two books about her ordeals during World War II in Nazi Germany.

Biography
She was born in a village near Chartres, France, in December 1908. Her first English publication was a children's book released in 1959.

She died on 19 October 2008 in Las Cruces in the United States at the age of 99.

References

1908 births
2008 deaths
French women writers
20th-century French women
French women memoirists